The 2021–22 season is FC Hansa Rostock's 18th season in existence and the club's first season back in the 2. Bundesliga, the second tier of German football, following their promotion from the 3. Liga in the 2020–21 season. The club will also participate in the DFB-Pokal.

Background and pre-season

Hansa Rostock finished 2nd in the 2020–21 3. Liga, level on points with third-placed FC Ingolstadt and winning automatic promotion as a result of their superior goal difference.

Pre-season

Competitions

2. Bundesliga

League table

Matches

DFB-Pokal

Transfers

Transfers in

Loans in

Transfers out

Loans out

References

Hansa Rostock
FC Hansa Rostock seasons